Carabia or Karabia, also known as Carrabia or Karrabia (Καῤῤαβία), was a town of ancient Macedonia, placed by Ptolemy in the district of Mygdonia. Its site is unlocated.

References

Populated places in ancient Macedonia
Former populated places in Greece
Geography of ancient Mygdonia
Lost ancient cities and towns